The windshield phenomenon (or windscreen phenomenon) is the observation that fewer dead insects accumulate on the windshields of people's cars since the early 2000s. It has been attributed to a global decline in insect populations caused by human activity.

Background 
As early as the 2000s it became a commonplace observation among drivers that windshields after a long drive no longer had to be cleaned of myriad insects. In 2016, Canadian naturalist John Acorn noted that the phenomenon had recently become a meme but questioned whether it is "reasonable to assume that windshields can tell us something about the overall numbers of insects" and also that "humans are notoriously bad at detecting trends". The windshield phenomenon was widely discussed in 2017 after major publications and media covered the topic of reductions in insect abundance over the last few decades. Entomologists stated that they had noticed that they no longer had to frequently clean their windshields.

Studies

Denmark
A 20-year study measured the number of dead insects on car windshields on two stretches of road in Denmark from 1997 until 2017. Adjusted for variables such as time of day, date, temperature, and wind speed, the research found an 80% decline in insects. A parallel study using sweep nets and sticky plates in the same area positively correlated with the reduction of insects killed by cars.

United Kingdom
In 2004 the Royal Society for the Protection of Birds (RSPB) asked 40,000 motorists in the United Kingdom to attach a sticky PVC film to their number plate. One insect collided with the plate for every  driven. No historical data was available for comparison in the UK. A follow-up study by Kent Wildlife Trust in 2019 used the same methodology as the RSPB survey and resulted in 50% fewer impacts. The research also found that modern cars, with a more aerodynamic body shape, killed more insects than boxier vintage cars. Another survey was conducted in 2021 by Kent Wildlife Trust and nature conservation charity Buglife, which showed the number of insects sampled on vehicle number plates in Kent decreased by 72% compared to the 2004 results.

References 

Extinction
Insects
Car windows